Corendon Airlines Europe, legally incorporated as Touristic Aviation Services Ltd., is a European charter airline headquartered in Luqa and based at Malta International Airport. It carries a Maltese air operators certificate and is a sister company of Corendon Airlines and Corendon Dutch Airlines.

History
Corendon Airlines Europe is a Corendon Airlines subsidiary based at Malta International Airport. The carrier commenced operations in May 2017. It forms part of a strategy by Corendon Tourism Group to expand European operations, with flights from the busiest airports of Germany to the popular holiday destinations within and outside of Europe.

Fleet

The Corendon Airlines Europe fleet consists of the following aircraft as of November  2022:

Destinations
Corendon Airlines Europe based its aircraft in several airports in Germany. Nuremberg, Cologne/Bonn, Munster/Osnabruck, Hannover were the major cities that the aircraft were based. In addition to these bases, as of Summer 2021, 2 aircraft will be based in Düsseldorf and 1 in Basel/Mulhouse.

Apart from the base airports, Corendon Airlines and Corendon Airlines Europe have been flying to the popular holiday destinations such as Turkey, Greek Islands, Canary Islands, Balearic Islands, Italy, Egypt and Tel Aviv from almost all cities of Germany.

Accidents and incidents
On October 1, 2021, several medical emergencies occurred on flight XR1050 from Cologne Bonn Airport to the island of Rhodes, when passengers passed out. Helpers present on board and crew members came for help. According to witnesses, panic broke out, but the flight was not interrupted, as a doctor on board says, it was safe to continue. The incident is being investigated by the Maltese Aviation Safety Authority.

References

External links

Airlines of Malta
Airlines established in 2017
Charter airlines